Irumpanam or Irimpanam is an important industrial region in the city of Kochi in the Indian state of Kerala. Located about 9 km (5.5 mi) from the city centre, it is a part of Tripunithura Municipality and lies between Tripunithura and Kakkanad. The Seaport-Airport Road (SPAP Road) passes through this place. Oil giants like Indian Oil Corporation, Bharat Petroleum and Hindustan Petroleum have plants located at Irumpanam.

Educational Institutions

 Vocational Higher Secondary School, Irumpanam
 S.N.D.P Lower Primary School, Irumpanam
 LPS, Irumpanam
 Lake Mount Global Public School
 Saraswathy Mandiram English Medium School
 Traum Academy for German and French Languages

Etymology
The place is believed to have been named "Hidumba Vanam" in the Mahabharatha era. Scholars speculate that Irumpanam is a corrupted version of Hidumba vanam.

Demographics

Irumpanam is a part of Thrippunithura municipality in Ernakulam district in the Indian state of Kerala. As of 2001 India census, irumpanam had a handsome population. Males constitute 50% of the population and females 50%. Irumpanam has an average literacy rate of 89%, higher than the national average of 59.5%: male literacy is 90%, and female literacy is 88%. In Irumpanam, 10% of the population is under 6 years of age.

Administration

Irumpanam is still a part of Piravom assembly constituency.
Irumpanam was administered under Thiruvankulam Grama Panchayath under the Kerala Panchayati Raj act. In 2010, as a result of the re-organization of administrative divisions in Kerala, Irumpanam was merged with the Thripunithura municipality.

Places to visit

Karingachira Church
A Syrian Jacobite Church built in 722 AD near Hill Palace, Thripunitura. The church is named after Saint George. The Katthanar (Vicar) of Karingachira was considered the representative of the Nasarani community of the erstwhile Cochin State.
The Saint Parumala Thirumeni was ordained as a deacon in this church in 1857 AD.

This Church was elevated as a Cathedral by Patriarch Ignatius Zakka I Iwas in 2004.

Makaliyam Sreeramaswamy Temple
The Makaliyam Sreeramaswamy Temple is a famous temple of the Hindu deity Sri Rama. The temple is one among the few temples where Sri Rama is the deity. This temple is said to be built by the Chera Dynasty.

Vallikkav Bhagavathi Temple
The Vallikkav Bhagavathi Temple is a Temple surrounded by roots and has no statue of Devi. Vallikkav Bhagavathi is considered as Chottanikkara Devi

Perunninakulam Temple
Perunninakulam Temple is a temple of Lord Shiva with Lord Ganapathi. It is one of the few temples with a 'svayamboo vigraha', meaning the stone idol appeared on its own from the earth. The temple has a beautiful Ambala Kulam or pond.

Economic activities
Irimpanam is home to large petroleum corporations as well as numerous small scale and cottage industries. TRACO Cable Company, a cable manufacturer, as well major oil corporations like BPCL, IOC, HPCL have their presence here. Agriculture has fallen from the status of the prime means of livelihood in Irumpanam. The major produces include coconuts, arecanuts, nutmeg, and pepper. Rice cultivation is on the decline.

Most people are employed in the city of Kochi, major employers being the Kochi Refineries, HOC, FACT and the Government of Kerala.

Location

References

External links
Tripunithura.net (The palace city of Kerala)
Tripunithura (The land of Temples)
BRIM-Scripting Generations Destiny (Bhavan's Royal Institute of Management (BRIM))

Cities and towns in Ernakulam district
Suburbs of Kochi